Martin Himma (born 30 August 1999) is an Estonian cross-country skier. He competed in the 15 kilometre classical and the sprint at the 2022 Winter Olympics. He was also the flagbearer for Estonia at the Parade of Nations.

Cross-country skiing results
All results are sourced from the International Ski Federation (FIS).

Olympic Games

Distance reduced to 30 km due to weather conditions.

World Championships

World Cup

Season standings

References

External links

1999 births
Living people
Estonian male cross-country skiers
Cross-country skiers at the 2022 Winter Olympics
Olympic cross-country skiers of Estonia
People from Tapa Parish
21st-century Estonian people